Tullio Grassi (5 February 1910 – 8 November 1985) was a Swiss football player and coach who played for Switzerland in the 1938 FIFA World Cup. He also played for FC Chiasso, Grasshopper Club Zürich, and FC Lugano.

References

External links

1910 births
1985 deaths
Swiss men's footballers
Switzerland international footballers
1938 FIFA World Cup players
Association football forwards
FC Chiasso players
Grasshopper Club Zürich players
FC Lugano players
Swiss football managers
FC Lugano managers
FC Chiasso managers